Bojke is a village in the municipality of Ulcinj, Montenegro.

Demographics
According to the 2011 census, its population was 161, all but one of them Albanians.

References

Populated places in Ulcinj Municipality
Albanian communities in Montenegro